Bronco Banyon McKart (born March 20, 1971) is an American former professional boxer who competed from 1992 to 2014 and held the WBO light middleweight title in 1996. McKart is best known for his trilogy of fights against Winky Wright.

Professional career

Nicknamed "Superman", McKart turned pro in 1992 and in 1996 captured the WBO Light Middleweight Title by beating Santos Cardona by TKO. He lost the title in his first defense to Winky Wright. In 2000, he would have the opportunity to avenge the loss, taking on Wright in an eliminator for IBF Light Middleweight Title. Wright won a dominant decision. In 2002 the two re-matched again, this time for Wright's IBF Light Middleweight Title. McKart was disqualified after trailing severely in the fight. In 2004 he took on WBA Light Middleweight Title holder Travis Simms, but lost a decision. In 2006 he was knocked out by the then undefeated prospect Kelly Pavlik. He fought Anthony Mundine at Palms Casino Resort on 14 July 2012. McKart retired in 2014.

Professional boxing record

See also
 List of WBO world champions

References

External links 
 
 http://www.boxinginsider.com/columns/jackie-kallen-bronco-mckart-rides/

1971 births
Light-middleweight boxers
Living people
World Boxing Organization champions
People from Monroe, Michigan
Boxers from Michigan
American male boxers